Took is a variant of the English surname Tooke, originally found predominantly in the East Anglia region of the United Kingdom. 

The name Took may refer to:

People
Barry Took (1928–2002), British comedian and television presenter
Steve Peregrin Took (1949–1980), British musician and songwriter
Took Leng How (1981–2006), Malaysian murderer
Roger Took, British art historian and sex offender

Fiction
Peregrin Took, fictional character in The Lord of the Rings by J.R.R. Tolkien

See also

Tooke
Toon (name)
Tuke (disambiguation)
Tuque